J. Albert Walker Sports Field is a Canadian urban park and sports field located in the Cowie Hill neighbourhood of Halifax, Nova Scotia. The park is located next to the Chebucto Heights Elementary School.

Features
 soccer pitch
 basketball court
 baseball diamonds
 playground

History
The park was named in memory of the late J. Albert Walker, a Canadian businessman and politician from Halifax County, Nova Scotia. He was elected to City Council in 1974 as Alderman and again in 1984. The city council then elected him to be deputy mayor. Walker retired in 1988, delivering a short farewell speech in council on October 27, 1988.

References 

Parks in Halifax, Nova Scotia